Come to Daddy may refer to:

 Come to Daddy (song), 1997 song by Aphex Twin
 Come to Daddy (EP), 1997 extended play by Aphex Twin
 Come to Daddy (film), 2019 film